Houston County Airport  is a public airport located in McKinnon, in Houston County, Tennessee, United States. It is owned by Houston County.

Facilities and aircraft 

For the 12-month period ending December 27, 1999, the airport had 1,730 aircraft operations: 86% general aviation and 14% military.

References

External links 

Airports in Tennessee
Buildings and structures in Houston County, Tennessee
Transportation in Houston County, Tennessee